Fort Dick (Tolowa: Mvn-des-chuu-dvn) is a small unincorporated community  in rural Del Norte County, California. Its population is 912 as of the 2020 census, up from 588 from the 2010 census.It is located on the U.S. Route 101 corridor on the Redwood Coast. A post office was set up in 1917.

Etymology
Fort Dick Landing dates back to the Civil War era and was named after a settler's log house "fort" built by whites to defend from the Indians.  In 1888 a shake and shingle mill was moved there and the place renamed Newburg by the Bertsch brothers who owned the mill.  With the establishment of the post office in 1896, the old name was revived.

History

Pre-Settler contact
The heavily forested coast territory surrounding Fort Dick was occupied and used by the Tolowa and Yurok tribes of Native Americans.

Jedediah Smith's party reaches Lake Earl
Historical records state that a party travelling with Jedediah Smith entered the area of Fort Dick and skirted the eastern edge of Lake Earl between June 14 to 16, 1828. During this time, not only did they explore the area, but they made clear contact, including trading and engaging in commerce with the Tolowa Indians on the 15th. Jedidiah Smith's party "skirted" the eastern shore of Lake Earl.  Since his party was there in 1828, it predates the events that led the settler or farmer who owned the land called "Russell's Prairie" (later Fort Dick) by about twenty-five to thirty years.

The camp site of June 14 was on Elk Creek, one-fourth of a mile west of the junction of U.S. 101 and the Elk Valley road.  Exactly one month later, while eating breakfast the morning of July 14, 1828, Jedediah's party was attacked by at least one hundred Native American Indians. Everyone in the party except for Jedediah and two companions died in the ambush. They escaped and headed directly to Fort Vancouver.

Shipwrecks near Fort Dick and Crescent City
The coastal waters near Crescent City and north are notoriously treacherous. Over the years, there have been many ships sunk in the ocean close to Fort Dick and Crescent City.
 1850 - Paragon sunk
 1851 - Tarquin
 1855 - Steamer America burned in the harbor at Crescent City en route to Oregon and Washington
 1865 - The Steamer Brother Jonathan hit an uncharted reef near Point St. George.
 1941 - SS Emidio, an oil tanker, was shelled and torpedoed by a Japanese submarine.  This was the first ship sunk by the Japanese off the American Pacific coast in World War II.

Fort Dick Road (1862)
A civil war era letter indicates the existence of several roads heading to Crescent City; however, there is specific mention of a "Fort Dicks Road". The Union Quartermaster Swasey, who had written the letter, suggested it as the preferred path to travel north. Apparently, other roads existed at the time but were fraught with peril during times when the rivers were high.  The southern terminus of the Fort Dick Road was Camp Lincoln, which was strategically located at the junction of two pioneer roads leading north from Crescent City; the Fort Dick Road heading up the Coast, and the Crescent City Plank Road and Turnpike leading inland to the mining communities of Southern Oregon.

As recently as 1948, the Metzger Map for Del Norte County still showed the now-abandoned portion of the Fort Dick Road that followed the high ground south of Younkers Creek, before crossing the creek near the current crossing of Lake Earl Drive.  From there it continued overland to join up with what are now Lower Lake Road, Sarina Road, and Oceanview Drive and into southern Oregon.

When the coastal Roosevelt Highway serving the Oregon Coast was built in the 1920s, the original settlement of Fort Dick was relocated from the west end of Moorehead Road and moved to the east end of Moorehead Road in order for the community to remain on the primary route to the north.

Fort Dick during the Civil War
Perhaps it is best noted that the area now known as Fort Dick was once used by indigenous peoples of the region in the normal way they used any land. There were several tribes in the Humboldt region, but by the time Crescent City was founded, the Caucasians were having battles with the Tolowa nation, as well as other Native American tribes. Many of these tribes were frequently in a state of conflict or involved in minor battles with the individuals who came to settle the parcel of land.

Due to continuous unrest between the white settlers and the Native Americans, the military was eventually called in, at the bequest of the Department of Indian Affairs, in 1862 to establish a military presence on the site known as Fort Dick in 1862. It appears from historical documents published by the US War Department in the 1890s that thirty years earlier, the west was abuzz with Union troops. The letters written during the Civil War were compiled and published in the 1890s by the Secretary of War.

While the civil war raged in the eastern United States, there was a very active military presence of Union Soldiers building and summarily dismantling rough military outputs, camps, and forts that dotted northern California. It is in this context that there was an order sent out to establish a military settlement to keep peace between the settlers at Crescent City and the Native American populations in a reservation near the city. Ultimately, the military did not listen to the suggestions, and selected a site at what is now known as Camp Lincoln.  Camp Lincoln is 3 1/2 miles (5 km) south southeast of Fort Dick and roughly six miles north of Crescent City. The original buildings of Camp Lincoln were still standing during the 1950s and 1960s.

Native American claim to Fort Dick 

Two nations that are currently the closest are the Tolowa and the Yurok Nations. The federal government forced the large band of Yurok peoples onto a reservation they formed in 1855. The Yurok were moved around a few times for a variety of reasons. After a flood in 1862, the Yurok were relocated to the Smith River Reservation; however, it was closed down in July 1867. At that point, the American government relocated several of the coastal tribes onto the newly established Hoopa Valley Reservation. Among them were the Tolowa, Yurok, Mad River, and Eel River Indians. Presently, the Tolowa are the only tribe that have their ceremonial headquarters in Fort Dick; however, the Yurok, on their website, show a very vast region of land that included dozens of cities up and down that portion of the California coast.

Demographics

Government
Fort Dick has very few autonomous governmental services and is largely under the rule of Del Norte County. The remainder of the unincorporated city is subject to various county, state, and federal agencies.

Education
Educational services in Fort Dick are provided by the Del Norte County Unified School District, in conjunction with the Del Norte County Office of Education. At , with over 4000 students, they accomplish this by utilizing an elaborate public school busing network. The many district buses service eleven schools: eight elementary, one middle school, one high school, and one alternative high school. Fort Dick is the home to only one of the district's eight elementary schools. Redwood Elementary is equipped to educate students from the K to 8th grades. The school has a student population of 425 students, with a 21.8 student to teacher ratio. People living in Fort Dick must use education facilities in neighboring Crescent City for anything higher than the elementary school level.

Climate
This region experiences mild and dry summers, with no average monthly temperatures above 71.6 °F.  According to the Köppen Climate Classification system, Fort Dick has a warm-summer Mediterranean climate (Csb).

References

Further reading
 The War of the Rebellion: a compilation of the official records of the Union, United States Department of War, Washington, 1880.

External links
Tolowa Nation
Yurok Tribe
County of Del Norte website
Historic Book: Redwood National Forest
Del Norte County Tourism and Travel website
Brother Jonathan Shipwreck
Brother Johnathan Cemetery

Unincorporated communities in California
Unincorporated communities in Del Norte County, California
Populated coastal places in California
1862 establishments in California